Cash collection  Accounts receivable. It is the recovery of cash from a business or individual with which you have issued an Invoice.

Unpaid invoices are considered outstanding.

Invoices are always issued with terms of payment. These terms vary widely from 'Cash terms', to many forms of 'Credit terms' (for example 30 days from date of invoice).

Invoices which remain unpaid for periods longer than their 'terms' indicate are considered overdue.

It is the aim of the Cash collection function of a business to collect Monies for all outstanding invoices before they become overdue and to mediate payment arrangements to ensure that invoiced debts do not become doubtful or bad.

See also 
Invoice
Accounts receivable

References

External links 

Accounts receivable
Cash
Working capital management